This is a list of football grounds in India that have been used for football matches.

Stadiums 

Note. † denotes stadiums that have hosted international football matches.

2017 FIFA U-17 World Cup venues 

The initial shortlist of nine host cities was New Delhi, Pune, Mumbai, Margao, Bangalore, Kolkata, Kochi, Guwahati, and Navi Mumbai. Following the reception of FIFA's technical report, the AIFF cleared Kochi, Delhi, Navi Mumbai, Guwahati, Margao and Kolkata as the venues for the 2017 FIFA U-17 World Cup. The Jawaharlal Nehru Stadium (Kochi) was the first venue to be announced.

2022 FIFA U-17 Women's World Cup venues 

Kalinga Stadium in the city of Bhubaneswar got provisional clearance as the first venue for the 2020 FIFA U-17 Women's World Cup. In November 2019, FIFA local organising committee after second inspection of Vivekananda Yuba Bharati Krirangan in Kolkata, Indira Gandhi Athletic Stadium in Guwahati and Kalinga Stadium in Bhubaneswar, expressed their satisfaction with the preparation of infrastructure and the training facilities as the provisional venues for the tournament. On 18 February 2020, all the five venues were finalised and announced together with the official schedule. Ahmedabad, Bhubaneswar, Guwahati and Kolkata will host the group-stage matches, where as the knockout matches will be played in four cities except Guwahati.

See also
 List of cricket grounds in India
 List of stadiums in ok India
 List of international cricket grounds in India
 List of golf courses in India
 List of Field hockey venues in India
 Venues of the 2010 Commonwealth Games

References

External links
 www.sangamnersports.8m.com
 Football Stadiums in India
 Famous Football Stadiums In India

 
india
India
stadiums
Football stadiums